John Thomas Lutz (September 11, 1939 – January 9, 2021) was an American writer who mainly wrote mystery novels.

Career
Lutz's work included political suspense, private eye novels, urban suspense, humor, occult, crime caper, police procedural, espionage, historical, futuristic, amateur detective, thriller; virtually every mystery sub-genre. He was the author of more than forty novels and over 200 short stories and articles. His novel Single White Female was the basis for the 1992 film starring Bridget Fonda and his novel The Ex was made into the HBO original movie of the same title, for which he co-authored the screenplay. Lutz's novels and short fiction have been translated into almost every language and adapted for almost every medium.

Lutz served as president of both Mystery Writers of America and Private Eye Writers of America. Among his awards are the MWA Edgar Award, the Shamus Award (twice), The Trophee 813 Award for best mystery short story collection translated into the French language, the PWA Life Achievement Award, and the Short Mystery Fiction Society's Golden Derringer Lifetime Achievement Award. John Lutz also wrote stories for jigsaw puzzles.

Personal life and death
He and his wife, Barbara, split their time between St. Louis, Missouri, and Sarasota, Florida. Together, they had three children and eight grandchildren.

Lutz died as a result of complications from Lewy body dementia, Parkinson's disease, and COVID-19 in Chesterfield, Missouri, on January 9, 2021, at age 81, during the COVID-19 pandemic in Missouri.

Bibliography

Series
Alo Nudger
Fred Carver
Night
Frank Quinn

Standalone novels
 The Truth of the Matter (1971)
 Bonegrinder (1977)
 Lazarus Man (1979)
 Jericho Man (1980)
 The Shadow Man (1981)
 Exiled (1982) (with Steven Greene)
 The Eye (1984) (with Bill Pronzini)
 Shadowtown (1988)
 Single White Female (1990; original title: SWF Seeks Same; see also movie page Single White Female)
 Dancing with the Dead (1992)
 The Ex (1996) (adapted into a film — see The Ex (1997 film))
 Final Seconds (1998) (with David August)

References

External links
 

1939 births
2021 deaths
American mystery writers
20th-century American novelists
21st-century American novelists
American male novelists
Novelists from Missouri
Edgar Award winners
Shamus Award winners
American male short story writers
20th-century American short story writers
21st-century American short story writers
Writers from Dallas
20th-century American male writers
21st-century American male writers
Novelists from Texas
Deaths from the COVID-19 pandemic in Missouri